Jimmy Alviola Doña was a former Philippine international footballer. He was part of the Philippine squad that participated at the 2002 FIFA World Cup qualifiers.

International goals

Scores and results list the Philippines' goal tally first.

References

External links
 

1978 births
Living people
Filipino footballers
Philippines international footballers
Association football forwards
People from Cotabato